Opus musicum is a publisher established in 1969 in Brno, Czech Republic. It focuses on publishing of a music magazine under the same name but has also its own book series called Opus Musicum Library. Since its foundation the OM Library has published 20 titles. The music magazine is published every two months and contains studies and essays on music and related cultural themes, articles, reviews, news.

OM Library 
Volume I
Year: 1970
Zápisky o Antonínu Rejchovi, (ed. Jiří Vysloužil); Czech-French

Volume II
Year:1973
Ties - Relations - Parallels. Svazky - vztahy- paralely. Ruská a česká hudba, ( ed. J. Vysloužil a L. Ginzburg); Czech-Russian

Volume III
Year: 1977
František Jílek - monograph (ed. OM)

Břetislav Bakala - subscription extra (ed. OM)

Volume IV
Year: 1984
Vincenc Janáček: Jiřík Janáček's Biography, (ed. Jiří Sehnal); Leoš Janáček: Letters to his Uncle, Letters from his Mother, (ed. Svatava Přibáňová)

Kresby pro OM; výběr kreseb publikovaných v OM (ed. E. Drlíková)

Volume V
Year: 1987-1988
Josef Mysliveček v dopisech, (ed. Stanislav Bohadlo)

Volume VI
Year: 1990
Hádanka života. Korespondence Leoše Janáčka Kamile Stösslové ( ed. Svatava Přibáňová)

Volume VII
Year: 1991-1992
John Tyrrell: Česká opera

Volume VIII
Year:1992-1993
Písně rozmanité: Cantilenae diversae (ed. Miloš Štědroň)

Volume IX
Year: 1995
Vojtěch Kyas: Slavné hudební osobnosti v Brně

Volume X
Year:1998
Stále se mi zdá, že Tě někde hledám, Dopisy Jaroslava Ježka Míle Ledererové (ed. Hana Pospěchová)

Volume XI
Year: 1999, second edition: 2006
Soňa Červená: Stýskání zakázáno

Volume XII
Year: 1999
Soňa Červená: Heimweh verboten

Volume XIII
Year: 2000
The Korngolds, their Era and Contemporaries/ Die Korngolds, ihre Zeit und Zeitgenossen. (ed. Eva Drlíková)

Volume XIV
Year: 2001
Hugo Haas- fotografe, filmografie, divadelní role (ed. Vojen Drlík)

Volume XV
Year: 2001
Soňa Červená: Můjváclav

Volume XVI
Year: 2001
Soňa Červená: Grüss Gott, Herr Červený 
Německá verze knihy Můjváclav

Volume XVII
Year: 2002
Erich Wolfgang Korngold: Hudební dny. Musiktage/Music Festival (ed. Eva Drlíková)

Volume XVIII
Year: 2004
Leoš Janáček: Život a dílo v datech a obrazech (ed. Eva Drlíková)

Volume XIX
Year: 2004
Leoš Janáček: Život a dílo v datech a obrazech (ed. Eva Drlíková) 
German-French.

Volume XX
Year: 2007
Adolf Sýkora: Z mého života v Janáčkově kvartetu

External links 
http://www.opusmusicum.cz
http://www.vystavaOM.cz
Britannica

Publishing in the Czech Republic